Sumangali may refer to:
 Sumangali (child labour)
 Sumangali (1940 film), a Telugu film from India, starring Chittor V. Nagaiah and A. S. Giri
 Sumangali (1959 film), a Tamil film from India, starring K. Balaji and E. V. Saroja
 Sumangali (1965 film), a Telugu film from India, starring Nageshwara Rao and Savitri
 Sumangali (1971 film), a Malayalam film from India, starring Prem Nazir and Jayabharathi
 Sumangali (1983 film), a Tamil film from India, starring Sivaji Ganesan and Sujatha
Sumangali (1989 film), a Telugu film starring Krishnam Raju and Jaya Prada